The University of Technology, Sydney, Students' Association is the representative body for students at the University of Technology, Sydney. It is based on level 3 of building 1 at UTS. It publishes the student magazine Vertigo. The association has departments which have previously worked collaboratively with the university to achieve practical outcomes for students, as well as ensuring that the university is held to account over its handling of student issues. Historically, this has resulted in numerous successful campaigns which have won rights for students in the university.

Executive 
The executive of the UTSSA are responsible for the day to day operation of the Association, and are elected by the students annually.

2022 Executive 
The current executive members, elected for 2023 are:

Student Representative Council 

The Student Representative Council is the representative body of students at UTS. It was founded in 1966 under the NSW Institute of Technology.

Role 
The role of the SRC is to represent the students at the University of Technology Sydney Meetings are held monthly, and are open to all students. They are usually held on-campus and are promoted on social media pages. Important matters relating to student activism, concerns, budgets and the function of the association are raised at meetings. Motions are raised and voted upon by councillors, and are passed by a simple majority. However, a two-thirds requirement must be met to pass amendments to the constitution. Office bearers for the Queer, Enviro, Disabilities and Ethno-Cultural collectives are elected annually by the SRC at the "repselect" meeting. To be eligible, a candidate must be a General Councillor. Office bearers are elected by a majority by SRC members.

The UTSSA Student Council is democratically elected, with elections in the spring semester of each year.

Factions 
Like most bodies representing students in Australia, the SRC is divided into factions. The factions work together in groups,  in 2022 these are based on their election tickets: "Fire Up!" and "Left Action" (Labor Right, Labor Left), "Revive" (Independents, Socialist Alternative) and "Accountability" (Australian Democrats).

Student Unity 
Student Unity, the centre-left of Labor. The group is affiliated with national Labor Right and the Australian Labor Party. They are the largest faction in 2023 and have held the Presidency three times in the last four years. Student Unity's principles centre on unionism, service provision and comprehensive advocacy.

National Labor Students (Labor Left) 
National Labor Students, the unofficial student wing of Labor Left, its pillars are Feminism, Socialism, Unionism, and Democracy. The faction has a strong record on LGBTQIA+ rights and environmental action on campus. The faction contested the 2021 election under the "Fire Up!" ticket. Labor Left has 5 members on council.

Revive Independents 
The revive independents have a focus on ensuring the autonomy of the collectives on campus, fighting for environmental and social justice and protesting attacks on students and academics by the federal government. The faction is left-wing, with most members active and heavily involved in the association's collectives and campaigns. They are linked to the "grassroots independents," according to Honi Soit, and contested the 2021 election under the "Revive" ticket alongside Socialist Alternative. The faction has five elected representatives on council, one of those on the executive.

Composition 
The current Student Representative Council as elected for 2022:

Collectives

Women's

The Women's department creates a space and community for non-male identifying members of the UTS community and is affiliated with NOWSA. There is an Autonomous Space in Building 3. In 2016 they worked with the NUS Women's Officer to host the NOWSA conference for that year.

Welfare

The welfare collective is opened to all students but has in the past been asked to be the main organising body for students from low socio-economic backgrounds. The collective aims to help students by providing food and how2life workshops. These workshops have covered topics like cooking 101, renting how-to, and fair  rights.

Education

The Education Collective, also known as the Education Action Group, is open to all students and is focused on campaigning around issues that affect all students on campus. This includes fighting against fee hikes and cuts to staff and for a better trimester system, more library hours, in addition to other campaigns led by the National Union of Students.

Indigenous

The Indigenous Collective is composed of Aboriginal and Torres Strait Islander students. The Collective meets regularly and works alongside Jumbunna Institute for Indigenous Education and Research. Founded in 2012, they run campaigns surrounding Indigenous issues and have been an active political and pastoral component of the Students' Association since their inception. Camille Smith is Indigenous Officer for 2022.

Queer

The Queer department runs campaigns for LGBTIQ students on campus and maintains a Queer Space on campus. Campaigns include anti-homophobia campaigns, student safety campaigns, Pride Week, Anti Queer Youth Homelessness campaign, Gender Neutral Bathrooms campaign and works with the Out2Party club on social events. The Queer department also works closely with the UTS Equity Department.

Enviro

Affiliated to the Australian Student Environment Network, the Enviro Collective is focused on green activism and campaigns like 'Flick my Switch' and 'Fossil Free University' as well as environmental campaigns off-campus.

Disability

The Disabilities Collective is for UTS students who identify as having a disability and/or medical condition. The group operates without a space but cooperates with many internal UTS sectors to ensure students with disabilities receive adequate support. The group also campaigns around larger abilities awareness projects.

Ethno-Cultural

The Ethnocultural Collective is composed of students from across many ethnic backgrounds, races, religions and beliefs with the aim to promote harmony and peace through fostering the diversity at UTS. The collective works to ensure representation and supportive frameworks for students experiencing or at risk of prejudice and opposes all forms of discrimination against migrants, minorities, and people of faith.

International

The International Collective is for International Students at UTS who seek networking opportunities and space to protest on issues which affect them. Campaigns include the right to access student travel concessions and fairer fee structures.

Postgraduate

The UTS Postgraduate Committee is a group of students who aim to make a positive contribution to the educational experience of Postgraduate students. There a range of initiative the Postgraduate Collective advocate, including fairer fee structures.

References

External links
  UTS Students' Association - Official site
  Vertigo - Official site

Student politics in Australia
University of Technology Sydney